Iridomyrmex calvus is a species of ant belonging to the genus Iridomyrmex. Described in 1914, the species is native to Australia and New Caledonia.

References

Iridomyrmex
Hymenoptera of Australia
Insects described in 1914
Taxa named by Carlo Emery